Madog Crypl (or Madog Crippil), also known as Madog ap Gruffydd Fychan (c. 1275–1304/6) was a descendant of the sovereign Princes of Powys Fadog and Lords of Dinas Bran.  He is sometimes described as Madog III of Powys Fadog.  However, he was only lord of some of the family lands under the English crown.

He was still a child at the death of his father, Prince Gruffydd Fychan in 1289, so that the lands were placed in the custody of the queen and then of Reginald de Grey, Justice of Chester and then Thomas of Macclesfield.  Madog ap Gruffydd asked the king for a suitable provision to be made for him, and seems to have been granted his father's lands.  These apparently consisted of Glyndyfrdwy and half of the commote of Cynllaith, comprising the area around Sycharth.

Madog married Gwenllian, daughter of Ithel Fychan of Halkin and had a son Gruffydd of Rhuddallt, who was married on 8 July 1304 at the age of six to Elizabeth, daughter of John LeStrange of Knockin.

Death and Burial

Madog died circa 1304/1306 in his manor of Rhuddallt, probably in Glyn Dyfrdwy.

He was buried at Valle Crucis Abbey, Llangollen, an abbey founded by his grandfather, Madog ap Gruffydd Maelor. In 1956 the heraldic tomb slab of Madog was found at the Abbey and is now on display there. It is said to be the best preserved example of a stone monument in North Wales from this period. The carving shows a shield with a lion rampant, surrounded by the inscription in the upper half of the slab. A sheathed sword is diagonally set behind the shield and a spear runs vertically along the slab. The whole is decorated with vine leaves and bunches of grapes. The inscription reads:

HIC IACET : MA/DOC' : FIL' : GRIFINI : DCI : VYCHAN
This translates as: Here lies Madog son of Gruffydd called Fychan

Posterity 

Gruffydd of Rhuddallt became a ward of his father in law, who died in 1309.  Custody of his lands was then granted to Edmund Hakluyt, who sold the wardship to Roger Mortimer of Chirk.  However, he probably stayed with the LeStrange family, as Roger Mortimer disputed the validity of the marriage in 1305.  Gruffydd ultimately obtained possession of his lands in March 1321.  He held the two lordships by Welsh barony (pennaeth), which required him to serve in the king's army with his men at the king's expense.   In 1328, he settled his lands on himself and his wife in tail.  In 1332 he had custody of the manor and castle of Ellesmere, recently granted to his brother in law Eubolo LeStrange.  He died sometime after 1343.

Gruffydd was probably succeeded by his son Gruffydd Fychan II who is reported to have died shortly before 1370, and was the father of Owain Glyndŵr. However, some genealogical tables insert another generation with a Madog Fychan as son of Madog Crypl.

References
Welsh Princes based on Burkes Royal Families (1973)

Monarchs of Powys
1270s births
1300s deaths
Year of birth uncertain
Year of death uncertain